Stan Mayfield was a Representative in the Florida House of Representatives of the U.S. state of Florida. A member of the Republican Party, he served from 2000 until his death in 2008.

Biography

Born in Pensecola, Florida, Mayfield received his Bachelor's degree in Civil Engineering from the University of Florida in 1987. 

Elected to the state legislature in 2000, representing district 80, he succeeded Charlie Sembler. 

Mayfield lived in Vero Beach, Florida with his family. He died September 30, 2008, in Vero Beach, Fl at the age of 52, after a long battle with cancer. His wife, Debbie, succeeded him in that years election.

References

External links
Florida House of Representatives - Stan Mayfield

Republican Party members of the Florida House of Representatives
University of Florida alumni
1955 births
2008 deaths
20th-century American politicians